The brown hairy dwarf porcupine (Coendou vestitus) is a species of rodent in the family Erethizontidae. Found in the Andes in Colombia and Venezuela, its natural habitat is subtropical or tropical moist lowland forests. It is not easy to study as it is only known from a few specimens and wasn't recorded from 1925 until the 2000s. The porcupine is nocturnal and arboreal, feeding on leaves, shoots, and fruits. Habitat loss severely threatens it and it may even be extinct. Formerly listed as vulnerable, it is now designated data deficient. It is not known from any protected areas or conservation measures.

This species was formerly sometimes assigned to Sphiggurus, a genus no longer recognized since genetic studies showed it to be polyphyletic. Its closest relative is the frosted hairy dwarf porcupine (Coendou pruinosus).

References

Coendou
Mammals of the Andes
Mammals of Colombia
Mammals of Venezuela
Mammals described in 1899
Taxa named by Oldfield Thomas
Taxonomy articles created by Polbot